Jetcost.com is a travel metasearch engine for finding airfares. It acts as an intermediary, and does not directly sell flights or travel products. Since 2013, Jetcost has been a brand of Lastminute.com Group. The site is most popular in Western Europe and the top search words on the site are for Air France, Ryanair, and Transavia.

History
The website was launched on June 1, 2006.

In December 2013, Jetcost was acquired by Bravofly Rumbo Group (now Lastminute.com Group).

At the time of the acquisition in 2013, the company had revenue of €8 million. By 2017, revenue increased to €67 million.

References

French travel websites
French companies established in 2006
Transport companies established in 2006
Internet properties established in 2006
Travel ticket search engines
Metasearch engines